= 2018 Champaign County, Illinois Executive election =

- November 6, 2018

Nominee	Darlene Kloeppel	Gordy Hulten
Party	Democratic	Republican
Popular vote	41,158	36,631
Percentage	52.91%	47.09%
- Township results Kloeppel: 60–70% 70–80% Hulten: 50–60% 60–70% 70–80% 80–90%
County Executive before election
Position established
Elected County Executive
Darlene Kloeppel
Democratic

The 2018 Champaign County, Illinois Executive election was held on November 6, 2018, to elect the County Executive of Champaign County, Illinois. The 2018 elections is the first election for the position after voters approved a referendum that adopted a county executive form of government.

County Clerk Gordy Hulten won the Republican nomination unopposed and faced Democrat Darlene Kloeppel, the community services director for the Champaign County Regional Planning Commission, in the general election. As the campaign began, both Kloeppel and Hulten hosted a series of town hall meetings. Both candidates embraced the creation of the new position, and argued that they would work to move the county forward. Hulten focused on strengthening the county's finances following losses from a county-operated nursing home, while Kloeppel said that she would focus on establishing a longer-term strategic plan for the county.

Ultimately Kloeppel defeated Hulten, winning 53 percent of the vote.

== Democratic primary ==
=== Candidates ===
- Darlene Kloeppel, Champaign County Regional Planning Commission Community Services Director

=== Primary results ===
Democratic primary results
Party	Candidate	Votes	%
Democratic	Darlene Kloeppel	13,347	100.00%
Total votes		13,347	100.00%

== Republican primary ==
=== Candidates ===
- Gordy Hulten, County Clerk

=== Primary results ===
Republican primary results
Party	Candidate	Votes	%
Republican	Gordy Hulten	11,596	100.00%
Total votes		11,596	100.00%

== General election ==
=== Results ===
2018 Champaign County Executive election
Party	Candidate	Votes	%
Democratic	Darlene Kloeppel	41,158	52.91%
Republican	Gordy Hulten	36,631	47.09%
Total votes		77,789	100.00%
Democratic win (new seat)			
